Creme Fraiche (April 7, 1982 – October 9, 2003) was an American Thoroughbred racehorse.

Background
Creme Fraiche was sired by Rich Cream, co-holder of the world record of 1:19.40 for 7 furlongs on dirt in the 1980 Triple Bend Handicap. His dam Likely Exchange was a female-line descendant of Strange Device, a half-sister to the Kentucky Oaks winner Mars Shield.

Bred by Pamela Firman and her nephew, G. Watts Humphrey, Jr., Creme Fraiche was originally sent as a yearling colt to the 1983 Fasig-Tipton Kentucky July sale, where he was sold to Brushwood Stable for $160,000. He was sent from there to Virginia's Hickory Tree Stable for breaking where he proved unruly and was gelded.

Racing career
Although thought to be a "late bloomer", Creme Fraiche was a hardy three-year-old, winning the Derby Trial and the Belmont Stakes, with Eddie Maple astride, becoming the first gelding to win the classic race and the fourth consecutive Belmont winner for his trainer, Woody Stephens.  By the end of his three-year-old season, he had five graded stakes wins.

As a four-year-old, Creme Fraiche won the Jockey Club Gold Cup, defeating Turkoman, and ended the year with almost $1 million in additional earnings.

At five, he again won the Jockey Club Gold Cup (beating Java Gold) as well as the Meadowlands Handicap, and finished that year with a career high of $1,323,666 in earnings.

At six, he won both the January and December Tropical Park Handicap but never won another graded race again, with a third at age six in the W. L. McKnight Handicap as his best effort.

Retirement

Retired at age seven, Creme Fraiche was sent to Brushwood Stable near Malvern, PA, for pensioning.  He was visited by fans bringing his favorite treat of mints until he was put down due to a severe case of laminitis on October 9, 2003, at the age of 21.  He was buried at the farm in the memorial garden at Bryn Clovis.

Pedigree

 Creme Fraiche was inbred 4 × 4 to Heliopolis, meaning that this stallion appears twice in the fourth generation of his pedigree.

References

1982 racehorse births
2003 racehorse deaths
Racehorses bred in Kentucky
Racehorses trained in the United States
Belmont Stakes winners
Thoroughbred family 9-f